Nataliya Korabelnikova (born May 11, 1980) is a Kyrgyz former swimmer, who specialized in middle-distance freestyle events. Korabelnikova competed in two swimming events at the 2000 Summer Olympics in Sydney. She achieved a FINA B-cut of 4:24.63 from the Russian Open Championships in Saint Petersburg. On the second day of the Games, Korabelnikova placed thirty-fifth in the 400 m freestyle. Swimming in heat one, she edged out Singapore's Christel Bouvron on the final lap to pick up a fifth seed by almost a full second, in a lifetime best of 4:24.29. Three days later, Korabelnikova, along with Yekaterina Tochenaya, Anna Korshikova, and Anjelika Solovieva, placed fourteenth in the 4×200 m freestyle relay (8:41.21).

References

External links
 

1980 births
Living people
Olympic swimmers of Kyrgyzstan
Swimmers at the 2000 Summer Olympics
Kyrgyzstani female freestyle swimmers
Kyrgyzstani people of Russian descent